Blaster Mitchelle Medina Silonga (born 30 September 1999), popularly known as Blaster Silonga or mononymously as BLASTER (stylized in uppercase), is a Filipino singer-songwriter and a musician. He is known as the lead guitarist and co-vocalist of IV of Spades while he also pursues solo music and formed his own band known as "Blaster and the Celestial Klowns".

Early life
Blaster was born in Sta. Monica, Tañong, Marikina. He is the son of veteran musician Allan Silonga, a member of 90s band Kindred Garden and the singing group Daddy's Home which finished third in The X Factor Philippines, and the current Senior A&R Manager at Def Jam Recordings Philippines label under UMG Philippines. He has three siblings, namely Dave, Ashanti, and Alleinah.

Music career

IV of Spades

In June 2014, Allan Silonga decided to form a band for his son, who would become the band's lead guitarist. The Silongas were able to recruit drummer Badjao de Castro and bassist Zildjian "Zild" Benitez, who are the sons of Allan's friends. Unique Salonga, Benitez's churchmate who was already writing his own music, was later recruited to become the band's lead singer.

The band has released multiple singles, including the hit single "Mundo", and their debut album ClapClapClap!.

Solo career
On 13 August 2016, Silonga joined a music competition named "Music Hero" in the noontime show Eat Bulaga!. He originally won the "Electric Guitar Hero" title, but due to IV of Spades' rise to fandom, he and his bandmate, Zild Benitez, who also won the "Bass Hero" title, left their titles and gave it up.

In 2021, Silonga officially signed with UMG Philippines label Island Records Philippines. He released his debut single, "DISKO FOREVER", in both Japanese (released on 30 September 2021) and original Filipino version (released on 29 October 2021).

Coinciding with his solo career, he formed his own band The Celestial Klowns, consists of his brother Dave Silonga on bass, Crystal Jobli on keyboards, Max Cinco on drums, and songwriter-producer Dan Tanedo on guitars.

On October 8, 2022, Silonga released his debut studio album My Kosmik Island Disk, featuring 9 tracks including his newest singles "NARARARARAMDAMAN" and "O KAY GANDA".

Discography

As a solo artist

Studio albums

Singles

With IV of Spades

As a featured artist

References

Filipino rock musicians
21st-century Filipino male singers
Filipino songwriters
Living people
1999 births
Singers from Manila